Adwick may refer to:

Adwick le Street, village north of Doncaster in South Yorkshire, England
Adwick railway station serves the communities of Adwick-le-Street and Carcroft, near Doncaster in South Yorkshire, England
Adwick upon Dearne, village west of Doncaster in South Yorkshire, England

See also
Aldwick